Madame Gu is a superyacht built in 2013 at the Dutch Feadship yard in Makkum. She was built as Project Dream. Madame Gu is designed by Andrew Winch Designs, who were responsible for both interior and exterior, opting for contemporary details in a classical style. Naval architecture was done by De Voogt Naval Architects.

History
In March of 2022, Forbes reported that the yacht Madame Gu was still owned by Andrei Skoch. At 352 feet and registered in the Cayman Islands with a value of $156 million, by that month it had been sanctioned by the US, EU, UK, Australia, Canada, Japan, and Switzerland. It was recorded in the UAE on March 6, and blocked by the US on June 2, 2022. When designating it blocked property, US Department of the Treasury noted it contained a private helicopter, an elevator, beach club, gym, and also required "significant maintenance and repair" including around $1 million for painting annually. On June 23, 2022, it was recorded docked in Dubai, and had been since March 25. The Washington Post said the docking was a "a test for the close partnership between the United States and United Arab Emirates." It was observed flying an Emirati flag.

Design
The hull material is steel, while the superstructure is made out of aluminum with teak laid decks. The yacht is Lloyd's registered, issued by the Cayman Islands.

Engine
The main engines are four MTU 20V 4000 M73 with a power of  each.

Prizes
At the World Superyachts Award gala in Amsterdam she won the award for best Displacement Motor Yacht of 2,000GT and above. She was also presented with prize of Superyacht of the Year 2014.

See also 
 Motor yacht
 List of motor yachts by length
 List of yachts built by Feadship

References

2013 ships
Motor yachts
Ships built in the Netherlands